Oustalet's tyrannulet (Phylloscartes oustaleti) is a species of bird in the family Tyrannidae. It is endemic to Brazil. Its natural habitat is subtropical or tropical moist lowland forests. It is becoming rare due to habitat loss.

References

Oustalet's tyrannulet
Birds of the Atlantic Forest
Endemic birds of Brazil
Oustalet's tyrannulet
Oustalet's tyrannulet]
Taxonomy articles created by Polbot